Hyponectria is a genus of fungi in the family Hyponectriaceae.

Species
As accepted by Species Fungorum;

Hyponectria acaciae 
Hyponectria auripuncta 
Hyponectria betulina 
Hyponectria biparasitica 
Hyponectria buxi 
Hyponectria cacti 
Hyponectria contecta 
Hyponectria cookeana 
Hyponectria cooperta 
Hyponectria depressa 
Hyponectria dicalycis 
Hyponectria embeliae 
Hyponectria eugeniae 
Hyponectria flavonitens 
Hyponectria fusispora 
Hyponectria gossypii 
Hyponectria gregaria 
Hyponectria grevilleae 
Hyponectria jucunda 
Hyponectria magnoliae 
Hyponectria mohavensis 
Hyponectria oxystomella 
Hyponectria pandani 
Hyponectria penzigiana 
Hyponectria populi 
Hyponectria raciborskii 
Hyponectria rhododendri 
Hyponectria rubescens 
Hyponectria sinensis 
Hyponectria syzygii 

Former species;
 H. adenostomatis  = Polystigma adenostomatis, Phyllachoraceae
 H. astragali  = Stigmatula astragali, Phyllachoraceae
 H. australis  = Cesatiella australis, Hyponectriaceae
 H. consolationis  = Nectriella consolationis, Bionectriaceae
 H. dakotensis  = Nectriella dakotensis, Bionectriaceae
 H. dubitationum  = Passerinula dubitationum, Dothideomycetes
 H. lonicerae  = Discosphaerina lonicerae, Hyponectriaceae
 H. memecyli  = Plectosphaera memecyli, Xylariaceae
 H. onobrychidis  = Stigmatula astragali, Phyllachoraceae
 H. phaseoli  = Phyllachora dolichogena, Phyllachoraceae
 H. physocarpi  = Phyllachora physocarpi, Phyllachoraceae
 H. queletii  = Nectriopsis queletii, Bionectriaceae
 H. sceptri  = Charonectria sceptri, Bionectriaceae
 H. succinea  = Leiosphaerella succinea, Pseudomassariaceae
 H. sutherlandiae  = Stigmatula sutherlandiae, Phyllachoraceae
 H. therophila  = Phyllachora therophila, Phyllachoraceae
 H. volkartiana  = Polystigma volkartianum, Phyllachoraceae

References

External links
Index Fungorum

Amphisphaeriales
Taxa named by Pier Andrea Saccardo